This is a list of electoral results for the electoral district of Daylesford in Victorian state elections.

Members for Daylesford

 In the 1923 by-election, James McDonald of Labor was initially declared the winner, but a later recount established that Roderick McLeod had won.

Election results

Elections in the 1920s

 The initial result of 2,138 to McDonald and 2,136 to McLeod was overturned, and McLeod was awarded the seat.

Elections in the 1910s

References

Victoria (Australia) state electoral results by district